Elżbieta Katarzyna Łukacijewska (born 25 November 1966 in Jasło) is a Polish politician who has been serving as a Member of the European Parliament since 2009.

Political career
From 2001 until 2005, Łukacijewska was a member of Sejm. She was again elected to the Sejm on 25 September 2005, getting 14,166 votes in 22 Krosno district as a candidate from the Civic Platform list.

Łukacijewska was elected in 2009 as a Member of the European Parliament (MEP), and re-elected in 2014 and 2019. In parliament, she serves on the Committee on Transport and Tourism and the Committee on Women's Rights and Gender Equality. In addition to her committee assignments, she is part of the Parliament's delegation to the ACP–EU Joint Parliamentary Assembly.

Other activities
 European Logistics Platform, Member of the Advisory Board

See also
Members of Polish Sejm 2005–2007

References

External links

Elżbieta Łukacijewska – parliamentary page – includes declarations of interest, voting record, and transcripts of speeches.

1966 births
Living people
Members of the Polish Sejm 2005–2007
Members of the Polish Sejm 2001–2005
Civic Platform politicians
Civic Platform MEPs
Women MEPs for Poland
MEPs for Poland 2009–2014
MEPs for Poland 2014–2019
Articles containing video clips
Women members of the Sejm of the Republic of Poland
Members of the Polish Sejm 2007–2011
MEPs for Poland 2019–2024